Partners at Last is a 1916 British silent crime film directed by Ralph Dewsbury and starring Amy Brandon Thomas, Charles Rock and Chappell Dossett.

Cast
 Amy Brandon Thomas as Muriel Wright  
 Charles Rock as Edward Bradston  
 Chappell Dossett as William Wright  
 Hubert Willis as Joseph Trood

References

Bibliography
 Palmer Scott. British Film Actors' Credits, 1895-1987. McFarland, 1988.

External links

1916 films
1916 crime films
British silent feature films
British crime films
Films directed by Ralph Dewsbury
British black-and-white films
1910s English-language films
1910s British films